Satisfaction is a drama television series created by Sean Jablonski. It premiered on the USA Network on July 17, 2014.
On February 26, 2016, USA cancelled Satisfaction after two seasons. Season 1 was released on DVD on January 20, 2015.

Premise
Money manager Neil Truman and his wife Grace confront their relationship and life issues when Neil finds his wife having intercourse with a male escort.  Neil then decides to become an escort himself, unbeknownst to his wife.  Neil's experiences encourage him to then try to rekindle his marriage.

Cast

Main
 Matt Passmore as Neil Truman
 Stéphanie Szostak as Grace Truman
 Blair Redford as Simon Waverly, a male escort whom Grace pays for sex
 Katherine LaNasa as Adriana, the head of a male escort service
 Michelle DeShon as Anika Truman, Neil and Grace's teenaged daughter
 Deanna Russo as Stephanie, Grace's sister

Recurring
 Spencer Garrett as Victor O'Connell
 Tzi Ma as Zen Master
 Tom Nowicki as Charles Lipton
 Brittany Hall as Rosalie
 Leon Thomas III as Mateo
 Michael Vartan as Dylan
 Nicky Whelan as Emma Waverly
 Grant Show as Arthur Waverly
 Faran Tahir as Omar Sandhal
 JR Bourne as Barry

Episodes

Series overview
<onlyinclude>

Season 1 (2014)

Season 2 (2015)
On October 17, 2015, all episodes of season 2, along with the previous season, were made available for streaming on USA's website, as well as via the On Demand service on many cable systems.

Production
The series was created by Sean Jablonski, who had served as executive producer alongside Russ Krasnoff. It had been filmed in Atlanta.

Broadcast
Satisfaction premiered on USA on July 17, 2014, at 10 p.m. In Australia, the series premiered on June 14, 2015, on showcase. Although it shared title with the earlier popular Australian series of the same title and also dealt with the topic of escorting, the series is not related to this one in any way.

Reception
The first season scored an 82% approval rating on Rotten Tomatoes, while scoring 63 out of 100 "generally positive" on Metacritic based on 19 reviews.

References

External links
 
 

2010s American drama television series
2014 American television series debuts
2015 American television series endings
English-language television shows
Television series by Sony Pictures Television
Television series by Universal Content Productions
Television shows filmed in Atlanta
USA Network original programming
Television shows scored by Ludwig Göransson